Jakub Piotrowski (born 4 October 1997) is a Polish professional footballer who plays as a midfielder for Bulgarian club Ludogorets Razgrad.

Career
Between 2015 and 2018, Piotrowski played for Polish side Pogoń Szczecin.

On 14 May 2018, he signed a three-year contract (with one year in option) with Belgian side KRC Genk.

On 28 July 2020, Piotrowski joined 2. Bundesliga club Fortuna Düsseldorf on a four-year contract.

On 28 July 2022, Piotrowski moved to Bulgaria to play for Ludogorets Razgrad in the Bulgarian First League.

Honours
Genk
 Belgian First Division A: 2018–19

Ludogorets Razgrad
 Bulgarian Supercup: 2022

References

External links
 
 

Living people
1997 births
Sportspeople from Toruń
Association football midfielders
Polish footballers
Poland youth international footballers
Poland under-21 international footballers
Pogoń Szczecin players
OKS Stomil Olsztyn players
K.R.C. Genk players
S.K. Beveren players
Fortuna Düsseldorf players
PFC Ludogorets Razgrad players
Ekstraklasa players
I liga players
III liga players
Belgian Pro League players
2. Bundesliga players
First Professional Football League (Bulgaria) players
Polish expatriate footballers
Polish expatriate sportspeople in Belgium
Expatriate footballers in Belgium
Polish expatriate sportspeople in Germany
Expatriate footballers in Germany
Polish expatriate sportspeople in Bulgaria
Expatriate footballers in Bulgaria